This is a list in alphabetical order of cricketers who have played for Sri Lanka Police Sports Club in first-class matches. Where there is an article, the link comes before the club career span, and the scorecard name (typically initials and surname) comes after. If no article is present, the scorecard name comes before the span.

K
 Kanagarathinam Kabilraj (2020–21) : K. Kabilraj
 P. N. Kaluarachchi (2003–04)
 U. M. G. U. Karunaratne (2003–04)
 K. Kashappa (2015–16)
 U. Kaul (2018–19 to 2022–23)
 Ruwantha Kellepotha (2011–12) : R. P. Kellepotha
 S. Keshawa (2014–15)
 Gitansh Khera (2018–19 to 2022) : G. Khera
 Kamal Kiriella (1995–96) : K. Kiriella
 K. J. C. Kottearachchi (2000–01 to 2001)
 Manohara Kudagodage (1995–96 to 2004–05) : M. Y. Kudagodage
 S. R. Kumar (2008–09 to 2019–20)
 Dinesh Kumara (2009–10) : H. A. I. D. Kumara
 Pradeep Kumara (1998–99 to 2000–01) : J. P. Kumara
 K. M. P. Kumara (2014–15)
 Palitha Kumara (2007–08 to 2017–18) : M. M. P. Kumara
 P. Kumara (1986–87)
 Nishantha Kumara (2017–18) : P. W. G. N. Kumara
 R. C. Kumara (2020–21)
 S. A. C. Kumara (2021–22 to 2022–23)
 K. A. D. M. C. Kuruppu (2004–05 to 2007–08)

S
 Malith Kumara (2009–10 to 2010–11) : H. H. M. K. Silva

References

Sri Lanka Police Sports Club